The American-Hawaiian Steamship Company was founded in 1899 to carry cargos of sugar from Hawaii to the United States and manufactured goods back to Hawaii. Brothers-in-law George Dearborn and Lewis Henry Lapham were the key players in the founding of the company. The company began in 1899 with three ships, operated nine by 1904 and was operating seventeen by 1911 with three on order.

At the time of the company's founding, its steamships sailed around South America via the Straits of Magellan to reach the East Coast ports. By 1907, the company began using the Mexican Isthmus of Tehuantepec Route. Shipments on the Tehuantepec Route would transship at Atlantic Port of Coatzacoalcos (formerly Puerto) or the Pacific Port of Salina Cruz and would traverse the Isthmus of Tehuantepec on the  Tehuantepec National Railway. The contract, binding until completion of the Panama Canal, with American-Hawaiian for its entire cargo moving between oceans and assuring a minimum of 500,000 tons of sugar and other cargo was important in the railway's economic plans from its beginning. For the steamship line the Tehuantepec route enabled the company to serve both a New York—Honolulu route and a coastal route from Salina Cruz to Pacific ports of the United States. With new ships to be delivered the company planned to have four 8,000 ton ships on the New York—Coatzacoalcos route, six 12,000 ton ships operating on the Salina Cruz—Honolulu route and two 6,000 ton ships serving the West Coast route.

Company ships were used on both the Pacific and Atlantic routes. When American political troubles with Mexico closed that route, American-Hawaiian returned to the Straits of Magellan route.

When the Panama Canal opened for traffic in August 1914, American-Hawaiian began routing all of its ships via this route. The temporary closure of the canal because of a series of landslides forced the company to return to the Straits of Magellan route for the third time in its history.

During World War I, twelve of the company's ships were commissioned into the United States Navy; a further five were sunk by submarines or mines during the conflict.

Roger Dearborn Lapham, a future mayor of San Francisco, California, served as company president in the mid-1920s.

Ships

 SS Alaskan
 
 
 SS Arizonan
 
 
 
 
 SS Delawarean
 SS Floridian
 
 
 SS Honolulan
 
 
 
 SS Mexican
 
 
 

 SS Nebraskan, built by Bremer Vulcan, Bremen-Vegesack for North German Lloyd in 1912 as Elsass. The ship was seized by the United States on 6 April 1917 at Pago Pago, Samoa coming under the control of the United States Shipping Board as Appeles and then renamed Kermit in 1920 before acquisition by American-Hawaiian on 5 March 1920 for the price of $538,881.99 and being named Nebraskan. On 9 February 1942 the ship was delivered by American-Hawaiian to the War Shipping Administration (WSA) for operation under United States Army Transportation Corps charter with American-Hawaiian as the WSA agent, until title was transferred to WSA on 2 December for delivery of the ship under Lend Lease to the Soviet Union where the ship became Sukhona until return to the WSA on 6 April 1944. Returned to the Nebraskan name the ship was allocated to the Army on 17 October 1944 until returned for layup in the Wilmington Reserve Fleet on 17 October 1946. The ship was used by the Army in the Pacific as a floating mobile warehouse.
 
 SS Oregonian
 
 
 SS Texan
 [[USS Virginian (ID-3920)|SS Virginian]]
 

World War II
During World War II, the company operated ships under the War Shipping Administration, some of which were company owned and taken over by WSA as was Nebraskan'', and others wartime built and delivered directly to WSA for operation by commercial agents.

World War 2 ships:
Benjamin Goodhue

 April 6, 1945, sunk by Japanese 
John Milledge
John Drake Sloat
Marine Eagle.
Alaskan Nov. 28, 1942 torpedoed, 7 crew and one 1 United States Navy Armed Guard killed
American June 11, 1942 torpedoed 
Arkansan June 15, 1942 torpedoed 
Coloradan Oct. 9, 1942 torpedoed 
Honolulan July 22, 1942 torpedoed 
Illinoian July 28, 1944 deliberately sunk to form breakwater, Normandy Beachhead 
Kentuckian Aug. 12, 1944 deliberately sunk to form breakwater, 
Normandy Beachhead Montanan June 3, 1943 torpedoed 
Ohioan May 8, 1942 torpedoed 
Oklahoman Apr. 8, 1942 torpedoed 
Oregonian Sept. 13, 1942 torpedoed 
Pennsylvanian Aug. 4, 1944 deliberately sunk to form breakwater, Normandy Beachhead 
Puerto Rican March 9, 1943 torpedoed 
Texan March 11, 1942 torpedoed & shelled 
Washingtonian April 7, 1942 sunk by submarine Cape 
San Juan Nov. 11, 1943 torpedoed 
Albert Gallatin Jan. 2, 1944 torpedoed 
Harrison Gray Otis Aug. 4, 1943 mined while at anchor 
William D. Burnham Nov. 23, 1944 torpedoed 
William M. Marcy Aug. 7, 1944 torpedoed

Post World War II
In the 1950s, the company ceased sailing operations and was taken over by Daniel K. Ludwig, who used it as a holding company into the 1960s. Ventures at that time included the development of Westlake Village, California.

See also

World War II United States Merchant Navy

References

Bibliography

External links
 History of the American-Hawaiian Steamship Company

American sugar industry
Defunct companies based in Hawaii
History of sugar
Transport companies established in 1899
1899 establishments in Hawaii
Business in Hawaii